Dahi may refer to:
 Dahi (curd), a traditional yogurt of the Indian subcontinent
 Ed Dahi, an Arab village in Israel
 Ad Dahi District, Yemen

People with the name 
Dahi Al Naemi (born 1978), Qatari footballer
Dahi Handi or Govinda Sport, Indian festival
DJ Dahi, American hip hop record producer and disc jockey
Roger Dahi, Syrian sport shooter